Xiaoxi (小溪; lit. brook) may refer to:

Towns named Xiaoxi (小溪镇)
Xiaoxi, Wuhe County, in Wuhe County, Anhui
Xiaoxi, Pinghe County, Fujian
Xiaoxi Township (小溪乡)
Xiaoxi Township, Yongshun County, in Yongshun County, Hunan
Xiaoxi Township, Yudu County, in Yudu County, Jiangxi